Stormy Waters is a 1928 American silent drama film directed by Edgar Lewis and starring Eve Southern, Malcolm McGregor and Roy Stewart. It is based on the story Yellow Handkerchief by Jack London.

Cast
 Eve Southern as Lola 
 Malcolm McGregor as Davis Steele 
 Roy Stewart as Captain Angus Steele 
 Shirley Palmer as Mary 
 Olin Francis as Bos'n 
 Norbert A. Myles as 1st Mate 
 Bert Appling as 2nd Mate

References

Bibliography
 Goble, Alan. The Complete Index to Literary Sources in Film. Walter de Gruyter, 1999.

External links

1928 films
1928 drama films
Silent American drama films
Films directed by Edgar Lewis
American silent feature films
1920s English-language films
American black-and-white films
Tiffany Pictures films
Seafaring films
Films based on works by Jack London
1920s American films
Silent adventure films